RMLI Gosport F.C. were a successful army football club based in Gosport, Hampshire.

History

The club were formed in the early 1900s as the football team of the Royal Marine Light Infantry - based at Forton Army Barracks in Gosport. 
During this time there were a number of short-lived regimental sides from the military playing in the Hampshire League and various cup competitions, but this long running outfit were by far the most successful.

RMLI Gosport soon developed a fine cup pedigree - in 1908 they reached the Hampshire Senior Cup Final but narrowly lost 0–1 against Southampton Reserves - in a game played at Fratton Park, Portsmouth.

Their most successful season was in 1909/10 when they won the Army Cup - to the joy of the Commander, who organized a bicycle ride to rally Bandsmen living in the area so that the returning team might be properly greeted on its arrival back at Gosport Railway Station. Success followed success, for within weeks the RMLI (affiliated to the Hampshire FA), made the long journey to the North East to Bishop Auckland where they famously defeated South Bank 2–1 to win the FA Amateur Cup, this without actually playing a single home game en route. Crowds gathered in the streets to again welcome the victorious team home.

After the Great War, the team reformed and there was another triumph in 1922 when they won the Hampshire Senior Cup - beating Bournemouth Poppies in the final (the score is not known). However, they were not members of any leagues until they joined the Hampshire League for the 1922–23 season when they finished 6th in the County Division (later to be renamed Division 1). That season they again enjoyed a good county cup run, but narrowly lost a hard-fought semi-final 0–2 against Thornycrofts (Woolston).

In 1923 the club was renamed Royal Marines Portsmouth and continued to be a strong force in the league before departing from the competition in 1928. They continued to enter Army competitions and returned to the county league for the 1938/39 season when they finished Runners-up in Division 2 before the outbreak of War in 1939 during which the team disbanded.

Honours
FA Amateur Cup
Winners 1909/10
Army Cup
Winners 1909/10
Hampshire Senior Cup
Winners 1921/22
Finalists 1907/08 
Hampshire League Division 2
Runners-up 1938/39

Records

League

References

https://historicgosport.uk/forton-barracks/

Defunct football clubs in England
Association football clubs disestablished in 1939
Defunct football clubs in Hampshire
1939 disestablishments in England
Association football clubs established in the 20th century
Gosport